XHSCBW-FM is a community radio station on 100.5 FM in Yuriria, Guanajuato, Mexico. The station is owned by the civil association Yuririapundaro 104.7, A.C.

History
Yuririapundaro 104.7 filed for a community station on May 4, 2017. The station was awarded on November 28, 2018.

References

Radio stations in Guanajuato
Community radio stations in Mexico
Radio stations established in 2018